Astrothelium bullatothallinum is a species of corticolous (bark-dwelling) lichen in the family Trypetheliaceae. Found in Venezuela, it was formally described as a new species in 2019 by lichenologists André Aptroot and Harrie Sipman. It has roughly spherical ascomata, measuring 0.3–0.5 mm in diameter, which aggregate on the thallus surface in lines or in irregular groups. The ascospores are hyaline with three septa and measure 20–25 by 6–9 μm. The specific epithet bullatothallinum refers to the bullate (i.e., convex and swollen) thallus.

References

bullatothallinum
Lichen species
Lichens described in 2019
Lichens of Venezuela
Taxa named by André Aptroot
Taxa named by Harrie Sipman